Aylesbury is the county town of Buckinghamshire, South East England. It is home to the Roald Dahl Children's Gallery and the Waterside Theatre. It is in central Buckinghamshire, midway between High Wycombe and Milton Keynes.

Aylesbury was awarded Garden Town status in 2017. The housing target for the town is set to grow with 16,000 homes set to be built by 2033.

History

The town name is of Old English origin. Its first recorded name Æglesburgh is thought to mean "Fort of Ægel", though who Ægel was is not recorded. It is also possible that Ægeles-burh, the settlement's Saxon name, means "church-burgh", from the Welsh word eglwys meaning "a church" (<Latin ecclesia).

Excavations in the town centre in 1985 found an Iron Age hill fort dating from the early 4th century BC. Aylesbury was one of the strongholds of the ancient Britons, from whom it was taken in the year 571 by Cutwulph, brother of Ceawlin, King of the West Saxons; and had a fortress or castle "of some importance, from which circumstance probably it derives its Saxon appellation".

Aylesbury was a major market town in Anglo-Saxon times, the burial place of Saint Osgyth, whose shrine attracted pilgrims. The Early English parish church of St. Mary (which has many later additions) has a crypt beneath. Once thought to be Anglo-Saxon, it is now recognised as being of the same period as the medieval chapel above. At the Norman conquest, the king took the manor of Aylesbury for himself, and it is listed as a royal manor in the Domesday Book, 1086. Some lands here were granted by William the Conqueror to citizens upon the tenure that the owners should provide straw for the monarch's bed, sweet herbs for his chamber and two green geese and three eels for his table, whenever he should visit Aylesbury.

In 1450, a religious institution called the Guild of St Mary was founded in Aylesbury by John Kemp, Archbishop of York. Known popularly as the Guild of Our Lady it became a meeting place for local dignitaries and a hotbed of political intrigue. The guild was influential in the outcome of the Wars of the Roses. Its premises at the Chantry in Church Street, Aylesbury, are still there, though today the site is used mainly for retail.

Aylesbury was declared the new county town of Buckinghamshire in 1529 by King Henry VIII: Aylesbury Manor was among the many properties belonging to Thomas Boleyn, the father of Anne Boleyn, and it is rumoured that the change was made by the King to curry favour with the family. The plague decimated the population in 1603/4.

The town played a large part in the English Civil War when it became a stronghold for the Parliamentarian forces, like many market towns a nursing-ground of Puritan sentiment and in 1642 the Battle of Aylesbury was fought and won by the Parliamentarians. Its proximity to Great Hampden, home of John Hampden has made of Hampden a local hero: his silhouette was used on the emblem of Aylesbury Vale District Council and his statue stands prominently in the town centre. Aylesbury-born composer, Rutland Boughton (1878–1960), possibly inspired by the statue of John Hampden, created a symphony based on Oliver Cromwell.

On 18 March 1664, Robert Bruce, 2nd Earl of Elgin in the Peerage of Scotland was created 1st Earl of Ailesbury.

The grade II* listed Jacobean mansion of Hartwell adjoining the southwest of the town was the residence of Louis XVIII during his exile (1810–1814). Bourbon Street in Aylesbury is named after the king. Louis's wife, Marie Josephine of Savoy died at Hartwell in 1810 and is the only French queen to have died on English soil. After her death, her body was carried first to Westminster Abbey, and one year later to Sardinia, where the Savoy King of Sardinia had withdrawn during Napoleonic occupation of Turin and Piedmont; she is buried in the Cathedral of Cagliari.

Aylebury's heraldic crest displays the Aylesbury duck, which has been bred here since the birth of the Industrial Revolution, although only one breeder of true Aylesbury ducks, Richard Waller, remains today.

The town also received international publicity in 1963 when the culprits responsible for the Great Train Robbery (1963) were tried at Aylesbury Rural District Council Offices in Walton Street and sentenced at Aylesbury Crown Court.

A notable institution is Aylesbury Grammar School which was founded in 1598. The original building is now part of the County Museum buildings in Church Street and has grade II* architecture; other grammar schools now include Sir Henry Floyd Grammar School and Aylesbury High School. Other notable buildings are the King's Head Inn, (which, with the Fleece Inn at Bretforton, is one of the few public houses in the country owned by the National Trust and still run as a public house) and the Queens Park Centre.

James Henry Govier, the British painter and etcher, lived at Aylesbury and produced a number of works relating to the town including the church, canal, Walton, Aylesbury Gaol, the King's Head Inn and views of the town during the 1940s and 1950s, examples of which can be seen in the Buckinghamshire County Museum in Aylesbury.

The town is the birthplace of the Paralympic Games. During the 1948 Olympics in London, German-British neurologist Sir Ludwig Guttmann, set up a small sporting event for World War II veterans known as the World Wheelchair and Amputee Games (WWAG) at Stoke Mandeville Hospital Rehabilitation Facility in Aylesbury. This eventually led to the growth of the phenomenon of the modern Paralympic Games that has been held immediately after every Summer Olympic Games since 1988, and the WWAG was held most years at Stoke Mandeville until 1997, when it has been held in other countries and cities ever since. During the 2012 Paralympics, the official mascot was called 'Mandeville' after Stoke Mandeville Hospital.

The Rothschild Family acquired many large country estates and stately homes around and near the town, including Waddesdon Manor in nearby Waddesdon Village, Halton House near Wendover and Tring Park in Tring across the border in Hertfordshire, although today most of these properties belong to the National Trust. They have brought in increased tourism to the town and the surrounding areas.

Demography
The town's population has grown from 28,000 in the 1960s to almost 72,000 in 2011 due in the main to new housing developments, including many London overspill housing estates, built to ease pressure on the capital. Indeed, Aylesbury, to a greater extent than many English market towns, saw substantial areas of its own heart demolished in the 1950s/1960s as 16th–18th century houses (many in good repair) were demolished to make way for new, particularly retail, development.

Aylesbury's population in the ten-year period since 2001 has grown by two thousand primarily related to the development of new housing estates which will eventually cater for eight thousand people on the north side, between the A41 (Akeman Street) and the A413 and the expansion of Fairford Leys estate.

According to the 2011 Census, the religious groupings in Aylesbury were: Christianity (55.7%), no religion (26.9%), Islam (8.3%), Hinduism (1.4%), other (0.4%). 6.7% of respondents did not state their religion.

Geography

Neighbourhoods
Housing estates in or neighbourhoods of the modern Aylesbury include:
Bedgrove
Berryfields
Broughton
Buckingham Park
Coppice
Crown Leys
Elm Farm
Elmhurst
Fairford Leys
Haydon Hill
Hawkslade Farm
Kingsbrook
Mandeville Estate
Mandeville Park
Meadowcroft
Prebendal Farm
Quarrendon
Queens Park
Shakespeare Estate
Southcourt
Stoke Farm
Stoke Grange
Walton Court
Watermead
The Willows

Farms and hamlets
Aylesbury has also been extended to completely surround the hamlets and former farms at:
Bedgrove
California
Fairford Leys
New Zealand
Prebendal Farm
Quarrendon
Turnfurlong
Walton

Future developments
Distinct whole areas that have a notably high property price in the town are Bedgrove, the conservation area around St. Mary's Church and Queens Park, particularly facing onto the canal. Anticipated developments are expected to raise the urban population of Aylesbury from its current approximation of 75,000 to over 100,000 between 2018 and 2023.

Elevations, soil and geology
Aylesbury is immediately southeast of the upper River Thame that flows past Thame to Dorchester on Thames and is partly sited on the two northernmost outcrops of Portland (lime)stone in England bisected by a small stream, Bear Brook which gives a relatively prominent position in relation to the terrain of all near, lower, fields and suburbs, which have largely slowly permeable Oxford Clay and Kimmeridge Clay soils. Elevations range from 72.5m above mean sea level to 95m AOD in contiguous parts of the town, however nearest villages range from 85m-90m to the north or from 85m to 115m on a narrow ridge to the southwest at Stone and towards the Chilterns to the southeast (Weston Turville, Stoke Mandeville and North Lee).

The town centre's higher terrain is accurately described by Samuel Lewis in 1848 as a "gentle eminence".

The county's oldest rocks of Jurassic age cover the whole of the northern half of Buckinghamshire, succeeded continuously by younger rocks to the south of the Chilterns.

Culture and community

The town centre is home to many pubs and bars. The Queens Park Centre, which is the UK's largest independent arts centre is also based in the town centre.

The local newspaper is the Bucks Herald, which started publishing in January 1832. The local radio station is Mix 96, which first broadcast in April 1994.
One of the more prominent buildings in Aylesbury is the "Blue Leanie" office block, home to Lloyds Bank. When first built it was thought to be a potential hazard to passing motorists, due to the sun reflecting off its large mirrored surface. As a result, a line of mature trees was planted alongside the main road to prevent dazzling.

Aylesbury Waterside Theatre, a new £42 million theatre, with 1,200-seat auditorium, opened in October 2010. In addition to this, the surrounding area has been redeveloped a £100 million project known as the 'Waterside project'. When this is completed, there will be  of new retail floor space and 1,100 new jobs created, although when this will be completed now is unclear. A Waitrose supermarket opened opposite the theatre in August 2013, along with a Travelodge Hotel. Branches of Wagamama and Nando's restaurants opened on 'The Exchange' in February 2014, next to the Odeon cinema on Exchange Street. This included luxury and high-end studio apartments, new restaurants including Zizzi, The Grill Steakhouse and Rococo Lounge, as well as a new public square including metal statues that represent Aylesbury as the home of the Paralympics, as well as poetry covering the ground. Prior to this a Wagamama Japanese restaurant & Nando's have also opened on the site of the new square at the Exchange, known officially as 'Festival Square'.  Also, a new campus of the [Bucks New University] opened on the Waterside site next to the Waterside Theatre.

The Bourg Walk Bridge (also called the Southcourt Bridge or the Roberts Bridge after a local councillor) opened in March 2009 connecting Southcourt to Aylesbury town centre. The focus of the footbridge is a central concrete pillar with four suspension cables supporting the structure. This bridge forms a central part of the Aylesbury Hub project. Bourg Walk was nominated and won the Engineering Excellence Award 2009 awarded by the Institution of Civil Engineers – South East England branch.

Governance

There are two tiers of local government covering the town, at parish and unitary authority level: Aylesbury Town Council, based at Aylesbury Town Hall at 5 Church Street, and Buckinghamshire Council, which is also based in Aylesbury, having its headquarters at The Gateway on Gatehouse Road.

Aylesbury Town Council is the parish council for the town. As at May 2021 it comprises 25 councillors, 20 of whom are Liberal Democrats and 5 Conservative. The council represents only the constituents of Aylesbury town itself. Surrounding villages and some recent developments on the outskirts of Aylesbury like Fairford Leys & Watermead have their own parish council. In 2010 the district council decided that the new developments of Berryfields and Weedon Hill, both to the north of Aylesbury, should also join to form a new parish as of May 2011.

The town council also elects the town mayor from the serving town councillors every year. The process culminates in a formal "Mayor Making" ceremony where the new mayor takes over from the preceding mayor. The role of mayor is mainly a ceremonial role representing the town at various events and acting as an ambassador for the town.

Administrative history

Aylesbury was made a borough by a charter from Mary I in 1554, which gave the town the right to elect two members of parliament and to establish a council to govern itself. The right to establish a council was opposed by the prominent local landowner Thomas Pakington, and it seems likely that this element of the charter was not put into effect at that time. In 1650, following the English Civil War, the town did establish a degree of self-government under the auspices of the 1554 charter. However, in 1664, in the aftermath of the Restoration, the town's short-lived council was abolished and the rights it had held reverted to the Pakington family which had exercised them prior to the civil war. Thereafter the town was governed by its vestry in the same way as most rural areas, although it remained a parliamentary constituency.

In 1849 a local board of health was established to govern the town. This board was replaced by Aylesbury Urban District Council in 1894, which was subsequently given municipal borough status on 1 January 1917, becoming Aylesbury Borough Council. The borough council was awarded a coat of arms in 1964.

In 1974 Aylesbury Borough Council merged with several neighbouring districts to become Aylesbury Vale. No successor parish was initially created for Aylesbury, and it became an unparished area, directly administered by Aylesbury Vale District Council. The civil parish of Aylesbury was re-established in 2001, with its parish council taking the name Aylesbury Town Council. From 2001 to 2020 there were therefore three tiers of local government covering the town, at parish, district, and county level.

Aylesbury Vale District Council was abolished in 2020, merging with Buckinghamshire County Council and other district councils to become a unitary authority called Buckinghamshire Council. Since 1 April 2020, when Buckinghamshire Council came into being, it has been responsible for almost all statutory local government functions across the county.

Education
Aylesbury is home to one college of general further education (Aylesbury College on Oxford Road), three grammar schools, two community upper schools, an academy, a university technical college and a host of primary schools.
The secondary schools are:
Aylesbury Grammar School (boys only)
Aylesbury High School (girls only)
The Aylesbury Vale Academy
Buckinghamshire University Technical College
The Grange School
Sir Henry Floyd Grammar School
Mandeville School

There are also the following special schools:
The PACE Centre
Pebble Brook School
Stocklake Park Community School, formerly Park School

The Aylesbury Vale Secondary Support Centre is a Pupil referral unit (PRU), which caters for permanently excluded pupils.

Aylesbury Music Centre is a large educational establishment, which has its own premises adjoining Aylesbury High School and rivals the Royal College of Music, having produced members of national orchestras.

Health
Stoke Mandeville Hospital is a large National Health Service hospital to the south of the town centre. Its National Spinal Injuries Centre is one of the largest specialist spinal units in the world, and the pioneering rehabilitation work carried out there by Sir Ludwig Guttmann led to the development of the Paralympic Games. Stoke Mandeville Stadium was developed alongside the hospital and is the National Centre for Disability Sport in the United Kingdom.

Royal Buckinghamshire Hospital is a private hospital specialising in spinal cord injury.

Aylesbury has for mental health therapy and treatments the Tindal Centre on Bierton Road. The Tindal Centre closed in early 2014 and Mental Health therapy and treatments along with Adult and Older Adult Mental Health Team's moved across the road to the new purpose-built hospital the Whiteleaf Centre. The former site of Tindal Centre has been transformed into a new housing development Bierton Place which has maintained the architecture of the original building and enhanced its beauty

Trade and industry

Traditionally the town was a commercial centre with a market dating back to the Saxon period. This is because it was established on the main Akeman Street which became an established trade route linking London to the southwest. In 1180 a gaol was established in the town .

15th century
By 1477 flour was being ground in the town for surrounding parishes. By the modern period this had grown into a huge established industry: the last mill in Aylesbury was closed in the 1990s (Hills & Partridge on the canal behind Tesco). By 1560 the manufacture of needles had become a large industry in Long Crendon a village close by which was an important production centre.

17th century – lace making
In 1672 poor children in Buckinghamshire were taught to make lace as a way to make a living. Bucks lace as it became known quickly became very sought after and production boomed as the lace was mainly made by poor women and children. The lace-making industry had died out by Victorian times, however, as new machine-made lace became cheaper.

In 1764 Euclid Neale opened his clockmaking workshop in Aylesbury. In the 18th century, he was one of the best clock makers in the country.

19th century – canals
In 1814, the Aylesbury arm of the Grand Union Canal from Marsworth was opened bringing major industry to the town for the first time. At the same time the Wendover arm was built leading to nearby Wendover.

20th century – motor manufacture

From 1919 until 1925 the Cubit Engineering Works on Bicester Road was a volume manufacturer of motor vehicles. Approximately 3,000 cars were built, but a somewhat slow and heavy design could not survive the onslaught from cheap American competition. Their robust design and high ground clearance made them popular in less developed parts of the British Empire which lacked paved roads like Australia and South Africa. The works have been demolished for a domestic housing development. The marque is commemorated by Cubitt Street (and Edge Street) which traverses the old works.

By the late 20th century, the printers and bookbinders, Hazell, Watson and Viney and the Nestlé dairy were the two main employers in the town, employing more than half the total population. These factories have long since been demolished and replaced by a Tesco supermarket which opened in 1994, and a housing development, respectively.

21st century
Today, the town is still a major commercial centre and the market still meets on the cobbles of the old Market Square four days a week. Nestle and Hazell, Watson and Viney and US automotive parts producer TRW have gone – the last left the town in 2006. However three major industrial and commercial centres make sure the town has one of the lowest unemployment rates in the country.

Traffic improvement measures were paid for by Arla in order to reduce the impact of congestion and pollution.

Sport and leisure
Aylesbury has two local semi-professional football teams, Aylesbury Vale Dynamos F.C. which plays at Haywood Way and Aylesbury United F.C. which currently shares a ground with Chesham United. There is a strong cricket club in the town, that was formed in 1837 with success in the 1950s and 1980s and is again emerging as one of the strong clubs in mid- to north Buckinghamshire. Since 2013, Aylesbury has been host to a free 5 km run called the Aylesbury Parkrun.
Aylesbury is represented in Rugby Union by Aylesbury Rugby Football Club, situated at Ostler's Field in the nearby village of Weston Turville; 'The Ducks' play in the 7th tier of English Rugby.

Aylesbury's recent sporting success comes in Gymnastics with the Aylesbury Gymnastics Academy, training out of the lynx gym centre, producing two Olympians and both coming away with bronze medals in the Tokyo 2020 Olympic Games for Great Britain.

Transport
Rail
The town is served by Aylesbury railway station and Aylesbury Vale Parkway railway station; the latter is terminus of passenger services of the London to Aylesbury Line from London Marylebone. Stoke Mandeville also lies in the town's urban area.

Railways came to Aylesbury early, in 1839 when the Aylesbury Railway opened from Cheddington on Robert Stephenson's London and Birmingham Railway. The Metropolitan Railway (MetR) from Baker Street arrived via Amersham in 1892. The Great Central Railway (GCR) connected from Nottingham Victoria to London Marylebone via the MetR in 1899. Between 1899 and 1953, Aylesbury had railway links to four London termini: Marylebone, Baker Street, Paddington and Euston. The Aylesbury Railway closed in 1953, the MetR, which later became the Metropolitan line of the London Underground withdrew north of Aylesbury in 1936 and withdrew from the town in 1961. The GCR was dismantled north of Aylesbury in 1966. As a result, there were no regular passenger services north of Aylesbury until the opening of Aylesbury Vale Parkway railway station in December 2008. Now only the GCR south of Aylesbury Vale Parkway to Marylebone is used for regular London services.

A rail scheme to extend passenger services northwestwards to a new station, Aylesbury Vale Parkway, was completed in December 2008. This area is to be known as Berryfields, a major development area and will include park and ride facilities for Aylesbury.

A further expansion of rail services to a new Winslow railway station, Bedford and Oxford via the Claydon LNE Junction (see East West Rail) is due to be opened by 2030.} 
Until then connections are available to Oxford and Birmingham by changing at Princes Risborough.

Roads
The A413 and A418 roads also run through the town.

Buses
Aylesbury is served by Aylesbury bus station. In 2006, work commenced on the public transport hub, a scheme comprising a one-way loop of bus lanes around the town's inner ring road, which includes improvements to the connectivity between bus and rail services. The first two phases of this scheme were completed in 2007, providing new bus lanes on Exchange Street, New Street, Friarage Road and White Hill, and also opened up High Street to buses. The final two phases, including the Bourg Walk Bridge and Station Boulevard were officially opened in April 2009.

Aylesbury is well connected to local destinations by bus services. Run by Arriva Shires & Essex, these services run every 20–30 minutes to Milton Keynes (150), Oxford (280), High Wycombe (300), Thame (110/280), Tring (500), Hemel Hempstead (500) and Watford (500). Hourly services also run to Luton (61) and Leighton Buzzard (150/164). Arriva also runs services to RAF Halton via Weston Turville and Wendover (50); Chesham via Wendover, Great Missenden and Amersham (55); Steeple Claydon via Waddesdon and Quainton (with some services to Twyford and Marsh Gibbon) (16); Thame via Cuddington, Long Crendon and Worminghall (110); Buckingham and Maids Moreton via Whitchurch, North Marston, Winslow and Padbury (60).

Aylesbury is served by Buckinghamshire's first 'Rainbow Routes' network of bus services. The colour-coded routes were set up by Buckinghamshire County Council, and bus operators.

Cycling demonstration town
In 2005, the town won £1million funding to be one of six Cycling Demonstration towns in England, which was match-funded by Buckinghamshire County Council. This allows Buckinghamshire County Council to promote the use of cycling amongst the general public, as well as provide facilities for cyclists, such as bike lockers, bike stands, and Tiger and Toucan road crossings.

Cycle Aylesbury, the team created to undertake the Cycling Demonstration town work, recently opened the first of their Gemstone Cycleways, which are a network of routes running from Aylesbury town centre to various locations around the town, including Stone, Bierton, Wendover and Watermead. A second brochure/magazine was published to accompany the routes, along with a redesigned website, CycleAylesbury.co.uk.

Notable people

Aylesbury is or has been home to a whole range of notable people. In the latter part of the 20th century, the main maternity unit in the district was located in Aylesbury at the Royal Buckinghamshire Hospital; hence a large number of people were born in Aylesbury who may not have had any other association with the town. For a full list see People from Aylesbury. In alphabetic order of surname those who live or have lived in Aylesbury include:
Nathaniel King of Aylesbury
 Barns Courtney, singer and songwriter was born in Aylesbury in 1990
Sir David Jason, Actor, Lives in a hamlet on the outskirts of Aylesbury.
 Michael Apted, film director and producer was born in Aylesbury in 1941
 Benjamin Bates, physician
 Lynda Bellingham, actress and television presenter
 Rutland Boughton, English composer was born in the town
 Emmerson Boyce, footballer, born in Aylesbury
 Ernest Bullock, organist and composer, died in Aylesbury
Brendan Cole, professional dancer
 Mathilde Carré, French double agent, was once a detainee at Aylesbury Prison
 Sir Alexander Croke, British judge and Colonial Administrator in Nova Scotia, born in Aylesbury 1758
Greg Day playwright, born in Aylesbury, 1957
Jennifer Gadirova Team GB gymnast who won Bronze at the Tokyo Olympics., 
Jessica Gadirova Team GB gymnast who won Bronze at the Tokyo Olympics.
 Liam Gillick artist, born in Aylesbury, 1964
 Martin Grech, singer-songwriter
Ludwig Guttmann, founder of the Stoke Mandeville Games, later to become the Paralympic Games, lived and died in the town
 John Hampden, politician and Parliamentarian during the English Civil War, lived in Hartwell House.
 John Junkin, television performer and scriptwriter, died in Aylesbury
 Andrea Leadsom, Conservative Member of Parliament (MP) for South Northamptonshire; Minister of State for Energy at the Department of Energy and Climate Change; candidate for the leadership of the Conservative Party in 2016
 Samantha Lewthwaite, terrorist, grew up in Aylesbury
 Constance Markievicz, Irish politician, revolutionary nationalist, suffragette and socialist was an inmate of the prison in Aylesbury in 1916.
 John Otway, singer-songwriter
 Nicholas Parsons, TV presenter and actor (1923-2020) lived in Aylesbury and died at Stoke Mandeville Hospital.
 Charles William Pearson, missionary
 Matt Phillips, footballer, born in Aylesbury
 James Clark Ross, naval explorer, died in Aylesbury
 Vernon Scannell, poet
 William of Sherwood, logician and teacher
 Mike Smith, musician, of the Dave Clark Five lived in Aylesbury
Pete Trewavas, musician, member of Marillion
 Mark Webber, former Formula 1 driver who raced for Red Bull Racing, Jaguar Racing and Williams F1, with nine career wins. Born in Queanbeyan, Australia; resides in Aston Clinton (among other places)
 Ellen White MBE, England women's national football team, former Chelsea Ladies, Arsenal Ladies, Notts County Ladies, Birmingham City, and Manchester City football player was born and brought up in Aylesbury. Won the UEFA Women's European Championships in 2022.
 John Wilkes, radical MP for Aylesbury 1757 & 1761, lived at Prebendal House in the town
The Anchoress grew up in Aylesbury from the age of four.

Popular culture

A live music nightclub in Aylesbury was prominent in the 1960s, 1970s and 1980s and renamed the Friars' Club in 1969. The venue hosted many of the top artists of the time, including Jimi Hendrix, the Rolling Stones, Cream, Otis Redding, the Clash, Hawkwind, Queen, Genesis, U2, David Bowie, Talking Heads, Marillion & the Ramones. Friars' Club celebrated its 40th anniversary in 2009 by holding three special concerts that reflected the various phases of the club's musical history. The first concert in June featured the Edgar Broughton Band, the Groundhogs and the Pretty Things.

The rock band Marillion have a close association with Aylesbury. They originally formed there, with the band's first single, 1982's "Market Square Heroes", taking its title inspiration from Aylesbury's Market Square. The band continue to be based in the area, with their Racket Records studio still close to Aylesbury, and in 2007 the band performed together with their original lead singer, Fish, for the first time in 19 years at Aylesbury.

Aylesbury Methodist Church holds an annual organ recital, which attracts prominent national organists. The Roald Dahl Children's Gallery in Church Street, Aylesbury, is a children's museum in honour of novelist Roald Dahl that opened on 23 November 1996. Aylesbury hosts the Roald Dahl Festival, a procession of giant puppets based on his characters, on 2 July.

Comedian and actor Ronnie Barker (1929–2005) began his acting career in the town in the late 1940s and in September 2010, almost five years after his death, a bronze statue of him was unveiled by actor David Jason and Barker's one time co-star Ronnie Corbett (the other half of the Two Ronnies) on a new public place in Exchange Street.

Shown in productions
Scenes from the film A Clockwork Orange were filmed in Friars Square in Aylesbury but did not make it to the final cut. This is the 'Librarian Scene' where outtakes from the shoot and rehearsal can be seen in Alison Castle's The Stanley Kubrick Archives published by Taschen. The opening scene, in which the droogs beat up an elderly Irishman, is mistakenly cited as being filmed in the underpass linking Friars Square Shopping Centre with the railway station. However, Christiane Kubrick's book Stanley Kubrick – A Life in Pictures states that the underpass in the film has a different shape to the one in Aylesbury and these sequences were actually filmed in Wandsworth.

The County Court building and Aylesbury Market Square regularly feature in the BBC Television series Judge John Deed.

Twin town
Aylesbury is twinned with the French town of Bourg-en-Bresse, which is in the east of the country,  from Paris.

Places of interest with established encyclopaedia entries
Buckinghamshire County Museum
St. Mary the Virgin, Aylesbury
King's Head Inn
Roald Dahl Children's Gallery
Waterside Theatre, opened October 2010.

Closest cities, towns and villages

Gallery

Freedom of the Town
The following people and military units have received the Freedom of the Town of Aylesbury.

Individuals
 Mrs. Freda Roberts : 25 April 2016.
 Miss Ellen White : 25 April 2016.

See also

Architecture of Aylesbury
Aylesbury (UK Parliament constituency)

Notes and references
Notes

References

External links

Aylesbury Town Council
Aylesbury Vale District Council
 
 Aylesbury.info Regional Website

 
County towns in England
Hill forts in Buckinghamshire
Local government in Buckinghamshire
Towns in Buckinghamshire
Market towns in Buckinghamshire
Civil parishes in Buckinghamshire